Also see:

2009–10 FIS Ski Jumping World Cup

2009–10 FIS Ski Jumping World Cup Individual Points Table

Key:

FIS Ski Jumping World Cup